Marvik Chapel is a chapel of the Church of Norway in Suldal Municipality in Rogaland county, Norway.  It is located in the village of Marvik.  It is an annex chapel in the Sand parish which is part of the Ryfylke prosti (deanery) in the Diocese of Stavanger.  The white, wooden chapel was built in a long church style in 1920 using designs by the architect Johannes Thorvaldsen Westbye.  The chapel seats about 120 people.

Media gallery

See also
List of churches in Rogaland

References

Suldal
Churches in Rogaland
Wooden churches in Norway
20th-century Church of Norway church buildings
Churches completed in 1920
1920 establishments in Norway